Paralastor is a very large Australian genus of potter wasps.

Species
The following species are currently classified within the genus Paralastor:<ref name = Atlas>{{cite web | url = http://bie.ala.org.au/species/urn:lsid:biodiversity.org.au:afd.taxon:f6e85c51-c234-4617-a0ce-7935bbdc03cf#classification | title = ;;Paralastor Saussure, 1856 | accessdate = 23 April 2017 | publisher = The Atlas of Living Australia}}</ref>

 Paralastor abnormis (Bingham, 1912)
 Paralastor aequifasciatus Perkins, 1914
 Paralastor alastoripennis (Saussure, 1853)
 Paralastor albifrons (Fabricius, 1775)
 Paralastor alexandriae Perkins, 1914
 Paralastor anostreptus Perkins, 1914
 Paralastor arenicola Perkins, 1914
 Paralastor argentifrons (Smith, 1857)
 Paralastor argyrias Perkins, 1914
 Paralastor aterrimus Turner, 1919
 Paralastor atripennis Perkins, 1914
 Paralastor aurocinctus (Guérin, 1831)
 Paralastor auster Perkins, 1914
 Paralastor australis (Saussure, 1853)
 Paralastor bicarinatus Perkins, 1914
 Paralastor bischoffi Giordani Soika, 1961
 Paralastor brisbanensis Perkins, 1914
 Paralastor brunneus (Saussure, 1856)
 Paralastor caprai Giordani Soika, 1977
 Paralastor carinatus (Smith, 1857)
 Paralastor clotho (Lepeletier, 1841)
 Paralastor clypeopunctatus Schulthess-Rechberg, 1925
 Paralastor commutatus Perkins, 1914
 Paralastor comptus Perkins, 1914
 Paralastor conspiciendus Perkins, 1914
 Paralastor conspicuus Perkins, 1914
 Paralastor constrictus Perkins, 1914
 Paralastor cruentatus (Saussure, 1867)
 Paralastor cruentus (Saussure, 1855)
 Paralastor darwinianus Perkins, 1914
 Paralastor debilis Perkins, 1914
 Paralastor debilitatus Perkins, 1914
 Paralastor dentiger Perkins, 1914
 Paralastor despectus Perkins, 1914
 Paralastor diabolicus Turner, 1919
 Paralastor diadema Rayment, 1954
 Paralastor donatus Perkins, 1914
 Paralastor dubiosus Perkins, 1914
 Paralastor dyscritias Perkins, 1914
 Paralastor elegans Perkins, 1914
 Paralastor emarginatus (Saussure, 1853)
 Paralastor eriurgus (Saussure, 1853)
 Paralastor euclidias Perkins, 1914
 Paralastor eugonias Perkins, 1914
 Paralastor eustomus Perkins, 1914
 Paralastor eutretus Perkins, 1914
 Paralastor fallax Perkins, 1914
 Paralastor flaviceps (Saussure, 1856)
 Paralastor frater Perkins, 1914
 Paralastor fraternus (Saussure, 1856)
 Paralastor habilis Perkins, 1914
 Paralastor hilaris Perkins, 1914
 Paralastor icarioides Perkins, 1914
 Paralastor ignotus Perkins, 1914
 Paralastor imitator Perkins, 1914
 Paralastor infernalis (Saussure, 1856)
 Paralastor infimus Perkins, 1914
 Paralastor insularis (Saussure, 1856)
 Paralastor lachesis (Saussure, 1853)
 Paralastor laetus Perkins, 1914
 Paralastor lateritius (Saussure, 1867)
 Paralastor leptias Perkins, 1914
 Paralastor mackayensis Perkins, 1914
 Paralastor maculiventris (Saussure, 1856)
 Paralastor medius Perkins, 1914
 Paralastor mesochlorus Perkins, 1914
 Paralastor microgonias Perkins, 1914
 Paralastor mimus Perkins, 1914
 Paralastor multicolor Perkins, 1914
 Paralastor mutabilis Perkins, 1914
 Paralastor nautarum (Saussure, 1856)
 Paralastor neglectus (Saussure, 1855)
 Paralastor neochromus Perkins, 1914
 Paralastor occidentalis Perkins, 1914
 Paralastor odynericornis Giordani Soika, 1961
 Paralastor odyneripennis Perkins, 1914
 Paralastor odyneroides Perkins, 1914
 Paralastor oloris Perkins, 1914
 Paralastor optabilis Perkins, 1914
 Paralastor ordinarius Perkins, 1914
 Paralastor orientalis Perkins, 1914
 Paralastor pallidus Perkins, 1914
 Paralastor parca (Saussure, 1853)
 Paralastor petiolatus Schulthess-Rechberg, 1925
 Paralastor picteti (Saussure, 1853)
 Paralastor placens Perkins, 1914
 Paralastor plebeius Perkins, 1914
 Paralastor princeps Perkins, 1914
 Paralastor pseudochromus Perkins, 1914
 Paralastor punctulatus (Saussure, 1853)
 Paralastor pusillus (Saussure, 1856)
 Paralastor roseotinctus Perkins, 1914
 Paralastor rubroviolaceus (Giordani Soika, 1941)
 Paralastor rufipes Perkins, 1914
 Paralastor sanguineus (Saussure, 1856)
 Paralastor saussurei Perkins, 1914
 Paralastor semirufus Schulthess-Rechberg, 1925
 Paralastor simillimus Perkins, 1914
 Paralastor simplex Perkins, 1914
 Paralastor simulator Perkins, 1914
 Paralastor smithii (Saussure, 1856)
 Paralastor solitarius Perkins, 1914
 Paralastor subhabilis Perkins, 1914
 Paralastor submersus Turner, 1919
 Paralastor subobscurus Perkins, 1914
 Paralastor suboloris Perkins, 1914
 Paralastor subplebeius Perkins, 1914
 Paralastor subpunctulatus Perkins, 1914
 Paralastor summus Perkins, 1914
 Paralastor synchromus Perkins, 1914
 Paralastor tasmaniensis (Saussure, 1853)
 Paralastor tricarinulatus Perkins, 1914
 Paralastor tricolor Perkins, 1914
 Paralastor tuberculatus (Saussure, 1853)
 Paralastor victor Giordani Soika, 1977
 Paralastor viduus Perkins, 1914
 Paralastor vulneratus (Saussure, 1856)
 Paralastor vulpinus (Saussure, 1856)
 Paralastor xanthochromus Perkins, 1914
 Paralastor xanthus Giordani Soika, 1977
 Paralastor xerophilus'' Perkins, 1914

References

Biological pest control wasps
Potter wasps